The 1st Michigan Cavalry Regiment was a cavalry regiment that served in the Union Army during the American Civil War. It was a part of the famed Michigan Brigade, commanded for a time by Brigadier General George Armstrong Custer.

Service
The 1st Michigan Cavalry was organized at Detroit, Michigan, between August 21 and September 6, 1861. Among the initial officers was William d'Alton Mann, a future prominent Michigan newspaper and magazine publisher.

The regiment was mustered out of service on September 12, 1865.

Total strength and casualties
Over the span of its existence, the regiment carried a total of 2705 men on its muster rolls.

The regiment suffered 14 officers and 150 enlisted men killed in action or mortally wounded and 6 officers and 244 enlisted men who died of disease, for a total of 414 
fatalities.

Commanders
 Colonel Thornton F. Brodhead
 Colonel Charles H. Town
 Colonel Peter Stagg

See also
Bridget Diver
List of Michigan Civil War Units
Michigan in the American Civil War

Notes

References
The Civil War Archive

Cavalry
1865 disestablishments in Michigan
Military units and formations disestablished in 1865
Michigan Brigade
1861 establishments in Michigan
Military units and formations established in 1861
Military units and formations disestablished in 1866